Jabelscher See is a lake in the Mecklenburgische Seenplatte district in Mecklenburg-Vorpommern, Germany. At an elevation of 62.1 m, its surface area is 2.34 km2.

External links 
 

Lakes of Mecklenburg-Western Pomerania